Sporting Blood is a 1931 American MGM pre-Code sports drama film directed by Charles Brabin. The film stars Clark Gable (in his first starring role), Ernest Torrence, and Madge Evans. Two other pictures bore this same title, one released in 1916 by Fox and another by MGM in Sporting Blood (1940). Although they, too, centered on horse racing, none of the plots had any direct connection with the others.

Plot
Gambler Rid Riddell (Clark Gable) works for Tip Scanlon (Lew Cody), a crooked gambler, who buys Tommy-Boy, a racehorse from a wealthy man (Hallam Cooley) whose spoiled wife (Marie Prevost) loses interest. Tip and Rid consistently win with the horse in both honestly and dishonestly run races. But before long, Tommy Boy loses a race he wasn't supposed to, and the mob is after Tip.

Tip is murdered but not before giving Tommy Boy to his girlfriend (Madge Evans) who sets out to rehabilitate herself and the horse. The horse rebounds. After an attempt at sabotage, the horse wins the Kentucky Derby, and Rid wins the girl.

Cast
 Clark Gable as Warren 'Rid' Riddell
 Ernest Torrence as Mr. Jim Rellence
 Madge Evans as Miss 'Missy' Ruby
 Lew Cody as Tip Scanlon
 Marie Prevost as Angela 'Angie' Ludeking
 Hallam Cooley as Bill Ludeking
 J. Farrell MacDonald as MacGuire
 John Larkin as Uncle Ben
 Eugene Jackson as Sam 'Sammy'
 Tommy Boy as Himself, a Horse

Box office
According to MGM records, the film earned $547,000 in the US and Canada and $346,000 elsewhere resulting in a profit of $148,000.

References

External links
 
 
 
 

1931 films
1930s sports drama films
American horse racing films
American black-and-white films
Metro-Goldwyn-Mayer films
Films directed by Charles Brabin
American sports drama films
1931 drama films
1930s English-language films
1930s American films